Billbergia kautskyana is a plant species in the genus Billbergia. This species is endemic to Brazil.

References

kautskyana
Endemic flora of Brazil
Flora of the Atlantic Forest
Flora of Espírito Santo